The Mozingo Lake Golf Course is a  7,137 yard long, 18-hole municipal golf course on the banks of Mozingo Lake in Nodaway County, Missouri.

The course was designed by Donald Sechrest and opened in 1995.  It is a par 72 course and has a rating of 73.5 and a slope rating of 134 on Rye grass.   It is owned by the city of Maryville, Missouri.  According to the city website, Golf Digest and USA Today call it the "best course to play in the state of Missouri for under $50."

The signature hole is #8, a 170-yard, par 3, requiring a tee shot over a pond to the green.

In 2016 a Junior 9 golf course designed by Tom Watson opened.

External links
Official site

References

Buildings and structures in Nodaway County, Missouri
Golf clubs and courses in Missouri